"Rule" is the first single from American rapper Nas' 2001 album Stillmatic. It features a chorus sung by Amerie and production provided by Poke and Tone of Trackmasters Entertainment. The song is known for both sampling and interpolating "Everybody Wants to Rule the World" by Tears for Fears.

Overview
The song's lyrics are political, inspiration and reminiscent of those on Nas' 1996 single "If I Ruled the World (Imagine That)." It references this song in the beginning when Nas says:

"Life, they wonder, can they take me under? Naw, never that."

This references the intro to "If I ruled the World (Imagine That)" which is:

"Life, I wonder, will it take me under? I don't know."

As a single, "Rule" was not heavily promoted, but still reached #67 on the Hot R&B/Hip-Hop Singles & Tracks chart. "Got Ur Self A..." is mistakenly thought to be the first single on Stillmatic because "Rule" was not heavily promoted, did not receive music video treatment and was never released in compact disc format. It was released as a vinyl 12-inch single with "No Idea's Original" as its b-side.

It was featured in the 2003 film, Honey, it is also featured on the Like Mike soundtrack, but includes the edited version.

Single track list

A-Side
 "Rule (Radio Edit)" (3:57)
 "Rule (Instrumental)" (4:07)
 "Rule (Clean A Capella)" (4:02)

B-Side
 "No Idea's Original (Explicit)" (4:05)
 "Rule (Explicit Edit)" (4:07)

2001 singles
Amerie songs
Nas songs
Songs written by Amerie
Songs written by Nas
2001 songs
Song recordings produced by Trackmasters
Columbia Records singles
Songs written by Ian Stanley
Songs written by Jean-Claude Olivier
Songs written by Samuel Barnes (songwriter)
Songs written by Roland Orzabal